The Trinidad and Tobago Guardian (together with the Sunday Guardian) is the oldest daily newspaper in Trinidad and Tobago. The paper is considered the newspaper of record for Trinidad and Tobago.

History
Its first edition was published on Sunday 2 September 1917. The newspaper, now owned and published by Guardian Media Limited, began as a broadsheet but in November 2002 changed to tabloid format, known as the "G-sized Guardian". In June 2008, the paper changed to a smaller-size tabloid. The main office of the Guardian is located at St. Vincent Street, Port of Spain, with a branch office on Chancery Lane, San Fernando, and the Head office which is located on 4-10 Rodney Road in Chaguanas. On 2 September 2017, the Trinidad and Tobago Guardian celebrated its 100th anniversary. Shortly after on 11 September 2017, the company launched a new layout. The slogan of the paper is The Guardian of Democracy.  

Since 1955, according to an advertisement in Editor & Publisher, the Trinidad Publishing Co. operated the Guardian, the Sunday Guardian, and the Evening News.

See also 
 TBC Radio Network
 CNC3

References

External links 
 
 Scattered historical issues from the Digital Library of the Caribbean

Newspapers published in Trinidad and Tobago
Publications established in 1917
1917 establishments in Trinidad and Tobago